is a village located in Shiribeshi Subprefecture, Hokkaido, Japan. It is the second smallest municipality in Hokkaido by population, after Otoineppu.

As of September 2016, the village has an estimated population of 904. The total area is 147.71 km2.

Geography
Kamoenai is located on the western of the Shakotan Peninsula.

Neighboring towns and village
 Tomari
 Furubira
 Shakotan

Climate

History
Kamoenai was developed by fisheries. Kamoenai Village was merged with Akaishi Village and Sannai Village and became a Second Class Village in 1906.

Education
 Kamoenai Elementary School
 Kamoenai Junior High School

References

External links

Official Website 

Villages in Hokkaido